Improvised firearms (sometimes called  zip guns, pipe guns or slam guns) are firearms manufactured other than by a firearms manufacturer or a gunsmith, and are typically constructed by adapting existing materials to the purpose. They range in quality from crude weapons that are as much a danger to the user as the target to high-quality arms produced by cottage industries using salvaged and repurposed materials.

Improvised firearms may be used as tools by criminals and insurgents and are sometimes associated with such groups; other illicit uses include self-defense in lawless areas and hunting game in poor rural areas.

Types

Zip guns
Zip guns are generally crude homemade firearms consisting of a barrel, breechblock and a firing mechanism. For small, low-pressure cartridges, like the common .22 caliber rimfire cartridges, even very thin-walled tubing works as a barrel, strapped to a block of wood for a handle. A rubber band powers the firing pin, which the shooter pulls back and releases to fire. Such weak tubing results in a firearm that can be as dangerous to the shooter as the target; the poorly fitting smoothbore barrel provides little accuracy and is liable to burst upon firing. The better designs use heavier pipes and spring loaded trigger mechanisms. Larger zip guns, such as homemade shotguns called tumbera (Argentina), bakakuk (Malaysia), or sumpak (Philippines) are also made of improvised materials like nails, steel pipes, wooden pieces, bits of string, etc.

Pen guns

Pen guns are zip gun-like firearms that resemble ink pens.  They generally are of small caliber (e.g., .22 LR, .25 ACP, .32 ACP, .38-caliber, etc.) and are single shot.  Early examples of pen guns were pinfired, but modern designs are rim or centerfire.  Some pen guns are not designed to fire regular cartridges, but rather blank cartridges, signal flares or tear gas cartridges.

In the United States, pen guns that fire bullets or shot cartridges do not require a reconfiguration to fire, (e.g., folding to the shape of a pistol) and are federally regulated as an Any Other Weapon (Title II).  They require registration under the National Firearms Act and a tax in the amount of $200 to manufacture or $5 to transfer is levied.

Pipe guns
Pipe guns were first seen in the Philippines during World War II. The "paliuntod" is a type of improvised shotgun commonly used by guerrillas and the joint American and Filipino soldiers who remained behind after Douglas MacArthur's withdrawal. Made of two pieces of pipe that fit snugly together, the "paliuntod" were simple, single shot guns. These pipe guns are still in use by both criminals and rebels in the Philippines.

In 1946, pipe guns were patented in the United States by Iliff D. "Rich" Richardson, who fought with the Filipino insurgents during the Japanese occupation. Made by "Richardson Industries" as the "Model R5 Philippine Guerrilla Gun", these 12 gauge shotguns sold for $7 at the time.

Improvised versions are made by using two pipes and an end-cap; they usually fire shotgun shells. To fire the gun, the user inserts a shotgun shell into the smaller diameter pipe, places the smaller pipe into the larger diameter pipe, and forcefully slides it back until the shell's primer makes contact with a fixed firing pin located inside the end-cap.

Repurposed or conversions
Flare guns have also been converted to firearms. This may be accomplished by replacing the (often plastic) barrel of the flare gun with a metal pipe strong enough to chamber a shotgun shell, or by inserting a smaller-bore barrel into the existing barrel (such as with a caliber conversion sleeve) to chamber a firearm cartridge, such as a .22 Long Rifle.

More advanced improvised guns can use parts from other gun-like products. One example is the cap gun. A cap gun can be disassembled, and a barrel added, turning the toy gun into a real one. A firing pin can then be added to the hammer, to concentrate the force onto the primer of the cartridge. If the cap gun has a strong enough hammer spring, the existing trigger mechanism can be used as-is; otherwise, rubber bands may be added to increase the power of the hammer.

Air guns have also been modified to convert them to firearms. The Brocock Air Cartridge System, for example, uses a self-contained "cartridge" roughly the size of a .38 Special cartridge, which contains an air reservoir, valve, and a .22 caliber (5.5 mm) pellet. Examples of BACS airguns converted to firearms, either by drilling the barrel out to fire a .38 Special cartridge or by altering the cylinder to accept .22 caliber cartridges, have been used in a number of crimes. Blank-firing guns can also be converted by adding a barrel, although the low-quality alloys used for cheaper blank-firing guns may break with the pressures and stresses of a real bullet being fired.

Cryptic firearms

Some more complex improvised firearms are not only well-built, but also use mimicry as camouflage, taking the appearance of other items. Improvised firearms in the form of flashlights, cellular telephones, canes and large bolts have all been seized by law enforcement officials. Most of these are .22 caliber rimfires, but flashlight guns have been found ranging from small models firing .22 Long Rifle to larger ones chambered for .410 bore shotgun shells.

While most improvised firearms are single-shot, multiple-shot versions are also encountered. The simplest multi-shot zip guns are derringer-like, and consist of a number of single-shot zip guns attached together. The pepper-box design is also used in homemade guns because it is relatively easy to make out of a bundle of pipes or a steel cylinder. In late 2000, British police encountered a four-shot .22 LR zip gun disguised as a mobile phone, where different keys on the keypad fire different barrels. Because of this discovery, mobile phones are now X-rayed by airport screeners worldwide. Authorities believe they were manufactured in Croatia, and they still turned up in Europe as late as 2004, according to a report by Time magazine.

Submachine guns
Homemade submachine guns are often made by copying existing designs, or by adapting simple, open-bolt actions and leveraging commonly available hardware store parts.

The Błyskawica (Polish for lightning), was a submachine gun produced by the Armia Krajowa, or Home Army, a Polish resistance movement fighting the Germans in occupied Poland. Together with a Polish version of the Sten sub-machine gun, with which it shares some design elements, it was the only weapon mass-produced covertly in occupied Europe during World War II.

The Bechowiec (also known as the Bechowiec-1) was a Polish World War II submachine gun developed and produced by the underground Bataliony Chłopskie (BCh, Peasants' Battalions) resistance organisation. It was designed in 1943 by Henryk Strąpoć and was  produced in underground facilities in the area of Ostrowiec Świętokrzyski. Its name was coined after the Bataliony Chłopskie organization members who were informally called bechowiec (plural: bechowcy).

The Borz (Борз, Chechen for "wolf") submachine gun is one of a number of improvised firearms produced in Chechnya. It was produced in small numbers from 1992 to 1999. It was used primarily by Chechen separatists. It is named after the Borz (wolf) because of its position as Chechnya's national animal.

The Carlo (also referred to as Carl Gustav) is a submachine gun manufactured by small workshops in the West Bank. The design has been inspired by the Swedish Carl Gustav m/45 and its Egyptian Port Said variant; however, the similarity is often only passing. Produced in several locations and often with second-hand gun parts, the specifications are not uniform. Typically the weapon is automatic. Often chambered for 9x19mm handgun cartridges, variants for .22 LR, .32 ACP, 9 x 18mm, and  5.56 x 45 mm are also produced. The weapon itself is cheap to manufacture but is inaccurate and prone to jamming and misfires.

Liberators
The FP-45 Liberator and the Deer gun are crude zip gun-like pistols or derringers manufactured by the United States government for use by resistance forces in occupied territories, during World War II and the Vietnam War, respectively.

The FP-45 was a crude, single-shot pistol designed to be cheaply and quickly mass-produced. It had just 23 largely stamped and turned steel parts that were cheap and easy to manufacture. It fired the .45 ACP pistol cartridge from an unrifled barrel. Due to this limitation, it was intended for short range use, . At longer range, the bullet would begin to tumble and stray off course. The original delivered cost for the FP-45 was $2.10/unit, lending it the nickname "Woolworth pistol". Five extra rounds of ammunition could be stored in the pistol grip.

The Deer gun was a crude, single-shot pistol made of cast aluminium, with the receiver formed into a cylinder at the top of the weapon. The striker protruded from the rear of the receiver and was cocked in order to fire, and a plastic clip was placed there to prevent an accidental discharge, as the Deer gun had no mechanical safety. The grip had raised checkering, was hollow, and had space for three 9 mm rounds and a rod for clearing the barrel of spent cases. The Deer gun lacked any marking identifying manufacturer or user, in order to prevent tracing of the weapons, and all were delivered in unmarked polystyrene boxes with three 9 mm rounds and a series of pictures depicting the operation of the gun.  A groove ran down a ramp on top for sighting. The barrel unscrewed for loading and removing the empty casing. A cocking knob was pulled until cocked. The aluminium trigger had no trigger guard.

3D printed firearms

In 2012, the U.S.-based group Defense Distributed disclosed plans to design a working plastic gun that could be downloaded and reproduced by anybody with a 3D printer. The Liberator is a physible, 3D-printable single shot handgun, the first such printable firearm design made widely available online. The open source firm Defense Distributed designed the gun and released the plans on the Internet on May 6, 2013. The plans were downloaded over 100,000 times in the two days before the United States Department of State demanded that Defense Distributed retract the plans.

Defense Distributed has also designed a 3D printable AR-15 type rifle lower receiver (capable of lasting more than 650 rounds) and a variety of magazines, including for the AK-47. In May 2013, Defense Distributed completed design of the first working blueprint to produce a plastic gun with a 3D printer. The United States Department of State demanded removal of the instructions from the Defense Distributed website, deeming them a violation of the Arms Export Control Act. In 2013 a California company, Solid Concepts, demonstrated a 3D printed version of an M1911 pistol made of metal, using an industrial 3D printer. In 2015, Defense Distributed founder Cody Wilson sued the United States government on free speech grounds and in 2018 the Department of Justice settled, acknowledging Wilson's right to publish instructions for the production of 3D-printed firearms.

Around the world

In the United States, creating an improvised firearm for personal use does not require licensure, registration, a background check, or the stamping of a serial number, but the firearm created must be detectable by a metal detector per federal law. California, however, passed a law in 2016 that requires anyone planning to build a homemade gun to obtain a serial number from the state (de facto registration) and pass a background check. However, such firearms are often illegal in other jurisdictions and are commonly associated with gangs, where they may be used to facilitate violent crime, such as homicide. In other cases, they may be used for other criminal activities not necessarily related to violent crime, such as illegal hunting of game. Improvised firearms are most commonly encountered in regions with restrictive gun control laws. While popular in the United States in the 1950s, the "zip gun" has become less common.

A Khyber Pass copy is a firearm manufactured by cottage gunsmiths in the Khyber Pass region between Pakistan and Afghanistan. The area has long had a reputation for producing unlicensed, homemade copies of firearms using whatever materials are availablemore often than not, railway rails, scrap motor vehicles, and other scrap metal. The quality of such firearms varies widely, ranging from as good as a factory-produced example to dangerously poor. Much of the gunsmithing is centered around the town of Darra Adam Khel.

In India, use of improvised country-made pistols is widespread, especially in the regions of Bihar and Purvanchal. The manufacture of these weapons has become a cottage industry, and the components are often manufactured from scrap material; examples include gun barrels fashioned from truck steering columns.

In areas like South Africa, improvised firearms are more common. In a study of Zululand District Municipality, South Africa, it was found that most improvised firearms were crude, 12-gauge shotguns, with a simple pull-and-release firing mechanism; like .22 rimfire cartridges, shotgun shells operate at low pressures, making them more suited for use in weak, improvised barrels.

Even in the absence of commercially available ammunition, homemade black powder weapons can be used; such firearms were the subject of a crackdown in the People's Republic of China in 2008.

The city of Danao in Cebu, Philippines, has been making improvised firearms so long that the makers have become legitimate, and are manufacturing firearms for sale. The Danao makers manufacture .38 and .45 caliber revolvers, and semi-automatic copies of the Ingram MAC-10 and Intratec TEC-DC9.

In 2004, an "underground weapons factory" was seized in Melbourne, Australia, yielding among other things a number of silenced copies of the Owen submachine gun, suspected to have been built for sale to local gangs involved in the illegal drug trade.

Improvised firearms have also been used in Russia, where they have been used in domestic homicides and terrorism.

Improvised firearms were used by the perpetrator of the Halle synagogue shooting; the homemade shotgun and "Luty" submachine gun repeatedly malfunctioned. The attacker, an antisemitic neo-Nazi terrorist, said while livestreaming the attack, "I have certainly managed to prove how absurd improvised weapons are."

In Italy, Naples, Caivano, multiple illegal weapons by the notorious Camorra were found during a raid, among them was a homemade 22-caliber gun, 400 homemade shells (likely for another gun such as a lupara, another type of gun that is often homemade), a homemade suppressor, and a pen gun.

In Japan, an improvised shotgun was used in the assassination of Shinzo Abe, former prime minister of Japan, on 8 July 2022.

See also
Philip Luty
Improvised explosive device
Improvised artillery in the Syrian civil war
Barrack busters - Improvised mortars
Improvised weapon
Technical (vehicle)
Narco tank
Insurgency weapon
Marble gun
Privately made firearm
TM 31-210 Improvised Munitions Handbook

References

Further reading
Trub, J. David (1993) Zips, Pipes, And Pens: Arsenal Of Improvised Weapons Paladin Press. 
Anonymous (1983) Improvised Weapons of the American Underground Desert Publications.  
Luty, P. A. (1998) Expedient Homemade Firearms : The 9mm Submachine Gun Paladin Press. https://archive.org/details/Expedient_Homemade_Firearms_9mm_Submachine_Gun_P_A_Luty_Paladin_Press/page/n3 
Brown, Ronald (1999) Homemade Guns & Homemade Ammo Breakout Productions.  
McLean, Don (1992) Do-It-Yourself Gunpowder Cookbook  Paladin Press.  
Hollenback, George (1996) Workbench Silencers: The Art Of Improvised Designs Paladin Press.  
Métral, Gérard (1985) Do-It-Yourself Submachine Gun Paladin Press.  
Milosevic, Marko (2012) Prepravljeno i ručno pravljeno oružje [Converted and Improvised weapons]''http://www.bezbednost.org/upload/document/rucno_pravljeno_oruzje.pdf , BCSP.

External links

DIY flintlock pistol
Improvised & Craft-Built Firearms

Firearm construction
Homemade firearms
Insurgency weapons